Christophoros Nungovitch (born 14 December 1989 in Kinshasa, DR Congo) is a Cypriot professional handball player who plays as a goalkeeper for the Cypriot side Sabbianco Anorthosis Famagusta HC and captains the Cyprus men's national handball team. Nungovitch played for professional teams in Cyprus, Greece, France, Slovakia, Switzerland, Russia and Germany.

Honours

Club

EHF Challenge Cup 

 Winner: 2011–2012

Swiss NLB 
 Champion: 2018-2019

Greek 1st League 

 Champion: 2011-2012, 2013-2014
 Runner-up: 2012-13, 2014-2015

Greek Cup 

 Runner-up: 2013-14

Cypriot 1st League 

 Champion: 2008-2009, 2009-2010, 2010–2011

Cypriot Cup 
 Winner: 2008-2009, 2010-2011

National Team
Weihai International Beach Handball Tournament, China
  Champion 2017

Individual
  Russian Super Cup Final (against Chekhovskiye Medvedi) MVP: 2019
  International Tournament GoEasy-Cup Best Goalkeeper award: 2018
  EBT Petrolina Beach Handball Tournament Best Goalkeeper award: 2017
  4° International Handball Tournament Arminius Cup Best Goalkeeper award: 2017
  2° IHF Men’s Emerging Nations Championship All-Star: 2017
  Hellenic Handball Federation Best Goalkeeper: 2012, 2015
  Cyprus Handball Federation Best Young Goalkeeper: 2008

References

Notes

General

</ref>

Cypriot male handball players
1989 births
Living people